Yūsuke Teshima is a former Japanese motorcycle rider. In 2009 he won the Superstock 600 class in the All Japan Road Race Championship. He retired after the 2012 season and set up his own team CLUB PLUSONE with T.Pro Innovation, running Tomoyoshi Koyama and Satoru Iwata on Honda CBR600RRs.

Career statistics

By Seasons

By class

Races by year 
(key) (Races in bold indicate pole position)

References

External links

Living people
Japanese motorcycle racers
Sportspeople from Saitama (city)
Moto2 World Championship riders
1983 births